The year 2002 in video games saw the release of many sequels and prequels in video games, such as Final Fantasy XI, Grand Theft Auto: Vice City, Jet Set Radio Future, Metroid Prime, Onimusha 2, Pokémon Ruby and Sapphire, Pro Evolution Soccer 2, Resident Evil and Zero, Super Mario Sunshine, The Elder Scrolls III: Morrowind, and The Legend of Zelda: The Wind Waker, along with new titles and franchises such as Battlefield, Dungeon Siege, Kingdom Hearts, Mafia, Ratchet & Clank, Sly Cooper, SOCOM, and Splinter Cell. The year's best-selling video game was Grand Theft Auto: Vice City for the PlayStation 2, while the year's most critically acclaimed titles were Metroid Prime and The Legend of Zelda: The Wind Waker for the GameCube.

Trends
The market research company NPD estimated that video game hardware, software, and accessories sold about US$10.3 billion in 2002. This was a 10% increase over the 2001 figure.

Video game consoles
The dominant video game consoles in 2002 were:
Nintendo's GameCube
Microsoft's Xbox
Sony's PlayStation
Sony's PlayStation 2
Nintendo's Game Boy Advance

Handheld game systems
The dominant handheld systems in 2002 were Nintendo's Game Boy Advance and  Nintendo's Game Boy Color.

Critically acclaimed titles

Famitsu 
The following video game releases in 2002 entered Famitsu magazine's "Platinum Hall of Fame" and received Famitsu scores of at least 36 out of 40.

Metacritic and GameRankings
Metacritic (MC) and GameRankings (GR) are aggregators of video game journalism reviews.

Best-selling video games

Japan

United States

Europe

Australia

Events
 Academy of Interactive Arts & Sciences hosts the 5th Annual Interactive Achievement Awards; inducts Will Wright of Maxis to the AIAS Hall of Fame.
 BAFTA (British Academy of Film and Television Arts) holds 5th annual BAFTA Interactive Entertainment Awards for multimedia technologies; 10 of 21 awards go to video games; awards Ian Livingstone the BAFTA Interactive Special Award.
 Big Fish Games is founded with Paul Thelen as the only employee.
 Eidos Interactive selects Dutch model Jill De Jong as the new digitized Lara Croft character.
 Gama Network hosts the 4th annual Independent Games Festival (IGF).
 Game Developers Conference hosts the 2nd annual Game Developers Choice Awards.
 SEGA establishes the Sega Mobile division to develop, produce, and distribute video games for mobile phones and PDAs; establishes the Sega.com Business Solutions division to service video game developers and publishers.
 Rockstar Games embroiled in controversy for its Grand Theft Auto III and Grand Theft Auto: Vice City video games.
 Early 2002 – Titus Software buys out Interplay Entertainment's European operations, owning the rights to publish their games in Europe and also owning 100% of Virgin Interactive. They also buy a majority stake in Interplay.
 March 22 – The Sims overtakes Myst as all-time best-selling computer game, having sold 6.3 million units. 
 April 24 – G4 Media, LLC (subsidiary of Comcast Corporation) launches the G4 cable television video game network channel.
 May 14 – Virgin Interactive España is split up from its parent Titus Software and renames to Virgin Play, becoming the first "100% Spanish" game distributor and publisher.
 May 22–24 – 8th annual E3 (Electronic Entertainment Expo); the 5th annual Game Critics Awards for the Best of E3.
 July – IEMA (Interactive Entertainment Merchants Association) hosts 3rd annual Executive Summit.

Notable releases

See also
2002 in games

References

 
Video games by year